The Bogart Fire was a wildfire in the Bogart Park area of Cherry Valley in Riverside County, California. The fire broke out near Winesap Avenue and International Park Road just southwest of Bogart Park on August 30, 2016. By August 31, the fire was estimated at 1,300 acres.

Events 
The fire was first reported at 12:25 pm on August 30 at Bogart Park near Winesap Avenue and International Park Road. The fire soon forced the evacuation of 700 residents within the Highland Spring Village mobile home park and of residents in the Banning Bench area near Banning. 4 firefighters sustained minor injuries and one outbuilding was destroyed by the wildfire. In addition, more than 500 firefighters battled the fire.

By September 2, the fire was 100% contained at 1,470 acres in size.

Cause 
According to CALFIRE, the fire is believed to be caused by “juvenile activity” near Bogart Park in Beaumont.

References 

2016 California wildfires
Wildfires in Riverside County, California